Franciszek Koprowski (11 October 1895 – 2 June 1967) was a Polish military officer and modern pentathlete. He competed at the 1928 Summer Olympics.

Koprowski enlisted to the Polish Army in 1919, and fought in the infantry regiment in the Polish-Soviet War on the Lithuanian front. After the war, he remained in the military as a professional soldier, eventually becoming a physical training instructor at the Cavalry Training Center in Grudziądz. Since May 1939 he worked at the General Staff of the Polish Armed Forces. After the outbreak of World War II, he initially fought in the Polish Armed Forces in the West. Subsequently, Koprowski was transferred to the Cichociemni resistance group, and parachuted to occupied Poland in March 1943. Koprowski was also an officer of the Armia Krajowa resistance group. In November 1943, he was arrested by Gestapo in Wilno but managed to escape, and rejoined with the Polish Underground, and fought i.a. in the Operation Ostra Brama. After the war Koprowski was arrested by Soviet NKVD and imprisoned in Soviet camps until 1948, when he returned to Poland.

For his service in the fight for Poland's independence, he was awarded the Order of Virtuti Militari and four times the Cross of Valour.

References

1895 births
1967 deaths
Polish Army officers
Polish military personnel of World War II
Polish male modern pentathletes
Olympic modern pentathletes of Poland
Modern pentathletes at the 1928 Summer Olympics
People from Brodnica County
Sportspeople from Kuyavian-Pomeranian Voivodeship
Polish people of the Polish–Soviet War
Cichociemni
Home Army members
Recipients of the Silver Cross of the Virtuti Militari
Recipients of the Cross of Valour (Poland)